Richard Flynn is a New Zealand-British sound engineer. He was nominated for an Academy Award in the category Best Sound for the film The Power of the Dog.

Selected filmography 
 The Power of the Dog (2021; co-nominated with Robert Mackenzie and Tara Webb)

References

External links 

Living people
Place of birth missing (living people)
Year of birth missing (living people)
British audio engineers
20th-century British engineers
21st-century British engineers